
Ana Lake is a Patagonian lake in the Pali-Aike National Park, San Gregorio, Magallanes Region, Chile.

Fauna 
Birders frequent this locale to spot the least seedsnipe (Thinocorus rumicivorus), and other avafauna. Lago Ana is situated a few kilometres north of the Pali Aike Crater, a location from which archaeological recovery has evinced evidence of early prehistoric man in this region.

Lake in Canada 
Also Ana Lake is a lake in Ontario, Canada with Geographical coordinates 45°44'16" North and 79°02'24" West.

See also
 Cueva Fell

References
 Chris Goodie (2001) Birding the Americas Trip Report and Planning Repository
 C. Michael Hogan (2008) Pali Aike, The Megalithic Portal, ed. A. Burnham
 Ana Lake Map, Geographical Names of Canada

Line notes

Lakes of Chile
Lakes of Magallanes Region